Miss Venezuela 2004 was the 51st Miss Venezuela pageant, was held in Caracas, Venezuela, on September 23, 2004. The pageant was won by Mónica Spear of Guárico, who was crowned by outgoing queen Ana Karina Añez of Lara. The pageant was broadcast live on Venevision from the Poliedro de Caracas in Caracas, Venezuela.

Results

Special awards
 Miss Photogenic (voted by press reporters) - Andrea Gómez (Miss Distrito Capital)
 Miss Internet (voted by www.missvenezuela.com viewers) - Inmary Rodríguez (Miss Cojedes)
 Miss Popularity (voted by SMS Messages) - Anabel Montiel (Miss Zulia)
 Miss Congeniality (voted by Miss Venezuela contestants) - Bárbara Clara (Miss Amazonas)
 Miss Personality - Bárbara Clara (Miss Amazonas)
 Best Body - Mónica Spear (Miss Guárico)†
 Best Smile - Emmarys Pinto (Miss Lara)
 Miss Figure - Stephanie Thomas (Miss Miranda)
 Miss Elegance - Andrea Milroy (Miss Trujillo)
 Best Face - Andrea Milroy (Miss Trujillo)
 Best Skin - Alexandra Butler (Miss Monagas)
 Best Hair - Andrea Gómez (Miss Distrito Capital)

Delegates
The Miss Venezuela 2004 delegates are:

Notes
Mónica Spear placed as 4th runner-up Miss Universe 2005 in Bangkok, Thailand.
Andrea Gómez placed as semifinalist in Miss International 2005 in Tokyo, Japan.
Emmarys Pinto won Miss Intercontinental 2005 in Huangshan, China.
Bárbara Clara previously won Miss Italia Nel Mondo 2000 in Salsomaggiore, Italy.
Stephanie Thomas placed as semifinalist in Top Model of the World 2004 in Karlsruhe, Germany.
Julene Recao placed as finalist in Miss Mesoamérica 2004 in Houston, Texas, United States.
Desireé Pallotta previously placed as 3rd runner up in Top Model of the World 2003 in Aachen, Germany.
Jessica Jardim previously placed as 4th runner up in Miss Tourism World 2003 in Valencia, Venezuela.

References

External links
Miss Venezuela official website

2004 in Venezuela
2004 beauty pageants